2011 Live EP is a live EP by American rock band Red Hot Chili Peppers, released in 2012 through their website as a free MP3 download. As a way to celebrate the kick-off of the band's U.S. leg of their world tour, Chad Smith personally selected five of his favorite performances from the 2011 European leg of the tour for fans to download for free.

Throughout the I'm with You Tour, 72 hours after each show's completion, the band has been releasing an official bootleg of each show to their website for fans to purchase as a download.

Track listing

Personnel
Red Hot Chili Peppers
 Anthony Kiedis – lead vocals
 Josh Klinghoffer – guitar, backing vocals
 Flea – bass, backing vocals
 Chad Smith – drums, percussion

Additional musicians
Mauro Refosco – percussion
 Chris Warren – keyboards

References

External links
Red Hot Chili Peppers website
2011 Live EP

Red Hot Chili Peppers live albums
2012 EPs
2012 live albums
Live EPs
Red Hot Chili Peppers EPs